Mahadeshwarabetta  is a village in the southern state of Karnataka, India. It is located in the Hanur taluk of Chamarajanagar district.

Demographics
 India census, Mahadeshwarabetta had a population of 10,676 (5,518 males and 5,158 females).

See also
 Chamarajanagar
 Districts of Karnataka

References

External links
 http://Chamrajnagar.nic.in/

Villages in Chamarajanagar district